The Rissik Street Post Office was built in 1897 during the time of Paul Kruger. Built and designed by President Paul Kruger's architect Sytze Wierda the Post Office was at one time the tallest building in Johannesburg.

The Post Office became a national monument in 1978, and it remained in operation until 1996 when the South African Post Office vacated the building. The monument was gutted by a fire in 2009. The reconstruction with an estimated cost of R147-million began in 2016.

References 

Bank buildings in South Africa
Buildings and structures in Johannesburg